The Greensboro Commercial Historic District, in Greensboro, Georgia, is a  historic district which was listed on the National Register of Historic Places in 1987.  It included 29 contributing buildings and a contributing structure.

Most of its buildings are along Main St. and Broad St.  Two of the largest buildings occupy whole blocks, at the corner of Main and Broad:  the McCommons Store, known historically as the "Big
Store", a two-story brick building, and Copelan's Block, which includes one-story attached brick storefronts.

It includes the 1937 U.S. Post Office building, two historic jails, and the historic Greene County Courthouse.

References

External links

Historic districts on the National Register of Historic Places in Georgia (U.S. state)
National Register of Historic Places in Greene County, Georgia
Greek Revival architecture in Georgia (U.S. state)
Victorian architecture in Georgia (U.S. state)